Eugenia gilgii is a species of plant in the family Myrtaceae. It is found in Cameroon and Nigeria. Its natural habitat is subtropical or tropical dry forests. It is threatened by habitat loss.

References

gilgii
Critically endangered plants
Taxonomy articles created by Polbot